59 Aurigae, often abbreviated as 59 Aur, is a star in the constellation Auriga. Its baseline apparent magnitude is 6.1, meaning it can just barely be seen with the naked eye as a dim, yellow-white hued star.

For that reason, it has been given the variable star designation OX Aurigae. The star's spectrum matches that of an F-type main-sequence star and it has a spectral type of F2V. It has 2.5 times the mass of the Sun and 5.7 times the Sun's radius. 59 Aurigae is thought to be around 700 million years old, and is radiating 64 times the Sun's luminosity from its photosphere an effective temperature of 6,808 K.

References

External links
 HR 2539
 CCDM J06530+3852
 Image 59 Aurigae

F-type main-sequence stars
Delta Scuti variables
Double stars
Auriga (constellation)
Durchmusterung objects
Aurigae, 59
050018
033041
2539
Aurigae, OX